Asytegumen is a monotypic moth genus of the family Erebidae. Its only species, Asytegumen absurdus, is known from Borneo. Both the genus and the species were first described by Michael Fibiger in 2010.

The wingspan is 9–10 mm. The head, patagia, anterior part of the tegulae, prothorax, basal part of the costa and the area along the costa of the medial area are blackish brown. The forewing ground colour is brown; with dark-brown patches, including a tornal patch. The crosslines are all present and brown. The terminal line is well marked by brown interneural dots. The hindwing is grey, without a discal spot. The underside of the forewing is brown, while the underside of the hindwing is grey, without a discal spot.

References

The Moths of Borneo 

Micronoctuini
Noctuoidea genera
Monotypic moth genera